Miss Europe 1936 was the ninth annual Miss Europe pageant and the eighth edition under French journalist Maurice de Waleffe. New delegates from Syria-Lebanon, Morocco, Caucasus region, Sweden and Tunisia. Withdraws from Czechoslovakia, Danube, Denmark, Rhenanie (Saar Region) & Tunis.

Results

Placements

Delegates
 

 - Laure Torfs
 Caucasus Region  (In exile)- Tatiana Ouchakoff
 - Laurence Atkins
 - Lyne Lassalle
 - Neila Sikiari
 - Mia Kramer
 - Maria Nagy
 - Dany O'Moore
 Morocco - Aimée Gervais
 - Aslaug Simensen
  (In exile) - Ariane Gedeonova
 - Antonia Arquès
 - Birgit Engquist
 Syria-Lebanon - UNKNOWN
 Tunisia - Ethel Azzopardi

References

External links

1936 in Europe
1936 in Tunisia
Miss Europe